Bordj Bou Arréridj is a province (wilaya) in northern Algeria around 200 km from the capital Algiers. It is considered as a crossroads between the east and west, the north and south.

It is notable for its many electronic industries. Its capital is Bordj Bou Arreridj. Other localities include Bir Kasd Ali and Glela.

The estimated population of Bordj Bou Arreridj is about 661,115 residents.

Its location made it an important economic pole in the context of development in Algeria, as it is made up of several economic and industrial groups. Within the privatization process, and the market economy, this state has become a destination for some foreign companies in order to invest, especially in the field of electronic industries and agribusiness.

Location
The wilaya is located on the territory of the High Plains, riding on the mountain of Bibans; the wilaya of Bordj Bou Arreridj is geographically in eastern Algeria. Indeed, it is halfway through the route between Algiers and Constantine.

The Province is located northeast of the country. It is bordered by:
 East: Wilaya of Sétif.
 West: Wilaya of Bouira.
 North: Wilaya  of Bejaia.
 South: Wilaya of M'Sila.

Relief
The wilaya is divided into three geographical areas which follow:
 A mountainous area, with the north, the chain of Bibans.
 An area of high plains constitutes most of the province.
 A steppe zone, in the southwest, oriented agro-pastoral.
The altitude varies between 302 m and 1885 m.

Climate
The province is characterized by semi-dry continental climate that offers warm temperatures in summer and very cold in winter, among the lowest in Algeria. The annual rainfall is 300 to 700 mm. It's also known by the heavy snowfall, especially in the north, leading to the interruption of the roads and the difficulty in traffic especially on the National Road No. 05.

Hydrography
The wilaya of Bordj Bou Arreridj has many water sources; it recorded the presence of natural spas, whose waters come with healing powers. The most known is Hammam Al Biban in the west which has been renovated, and Hamam Al Ibaynan in the north. The main rivers flowing through the wilaya are Oued Bousselam and Oued el Ksoub in the south of the wilaya.

History
The wilaya has experienced various civilizations. The Romans, who left numerous traces, the Vandals, the Hammadids, the Almohads, but also the Ottomans and finally the French conquered the area and eventually settled there mainly because of its fertile land.
Mohamed El Mokrani, a historical figure, distinguished himself during the colonial period for having rebelled, with the support of local residents against the French presence. This revolt, known as the Mokrani Revolt, was followed by severe repression, which led to the execution and many deportations to New Caledonia, where an Algerian community still exists today, and the sequestration of the best land, delivered to European settlers.

During the war of Algeria, Bordj Bou Arreridj was part of the wilaya III (Kabylie), and Bordj Ghedir, in the south of the wilaya, was the site of many battles during the war in Algeria.

The province was created from Sétif Province in 1984.

Population
The province knows an imbalance in the distribution of populations created by the movement of people to the central high plains, one along the highways and urban centers because of natural constraints related to the nature of steppe and mountain areas in the north and south.

Culture
The Spring Festival is a traditional festival where every first Friday of March, the population of the wilaya go on a picnic. Families prepare foods and cakes typical of the region, with only natural ingredients: semolina, honey, butter, eggs, vegetables and dates.

The wilaya of Bordj Bou Arreridj is a mosaic of Algerian traditions that combine the Kabyles, Setifians, Sahraouis and Chaouis, and a crossroads of all rural and urban traditions of the country which gave a culinary wealth to the area. Thus, the olive is celebrated on the day of spring in the mountainous areas of North and throughout Kabylie. The south is marked by the traditions of Hodna, while the east by the traditions of Setifians. Chaoui culture is present in the municipalities bordering the mountainous provinces of Batna and M'sila, in the Daira of Bordj Zemmourah, some Turkish traditions remain.

Agriculture
Bordj Bou Arréridj is a preeminently agricultural province, the area of the Hautes Plaines being especially suitable for cereal cultivation. In the north, the mountainous area of the Bibans is dominated by tree crops, especially olive and fig trees; the area has many traditional oil mills. The southwest area is a steppe where pastoral farming is practiced extensively associated with the cultivation of cereal in fallow areas.

Industry
The wilaya of Bordj Bou Arreridj became a young industrial center. It is among the most dynamic wilaya of Algeria, particularly in the electronics industry and agribusiness. It was renamed by the Algerians: "Capital of electronics."
Several groups have settled national dimension as Cobra, Cristor, Star, Condor, Samsung and Nidor. Bordj Bou Arreridj is marked by its private contractors.

The Algerian government encourages the development of the High Plains (Setif - Bordj Bou Arreridj) through the deployment of several major initiatives such as: construction of infrastructure such as the East-West highway and creating areas of integrated industrial activities. A new industrial area was established in the commune of El Hamadia to relieve the industrial area of the city of Bordj Bou Arreridj.

Administrative divisions
It is made up of 10 districts and 34 communes or municipalities.

Districts

 Aïn Taghrout
 Bir Kasd Ali
 Bordj Bou Arréridj (District-municipality)
 Bordj Ghedir
 Bordj Zemmoura
 Djaâfra
 El Hamadia
 Mansourah
 Medjana
 Ras El Oued

Communes

 Achabou
 Aïn Taghrout
 Aïn Tesra
 Belimour
 Ben Daoud
 Bir Kasdali
 Bordj-Bou-Arreridj
 Bordj Ghédir
 Bordj Zemoura
 Colla
 Djaafra
 El Ach
 El Achir
 El Anseur
 El Hamadia
 El Main
 El M'hir
 Ghilassa
 Haraza
 Hasnaoua
 Khelil
 Ksour
 Mansoura
 Medjana
 Ouled Brahem
 Ouled Dahmane
 Ouled Sidi Brahim
 Rabta
 Ras El Oued
 Sidi Embarek
 Tafreg
 Taglait
 Teniet En-Nasr
 Tesmart
 Tixter

References

External links
  Official website of Bordj Bou Arréridj Province

 
Provinces of Algeria
States and territories established in 1984